Charlie Cocuzza is a former head football coach for the Kean University Cougars in Union, New Jersey. In three seasons as head coach he compiled a record of 7–23. Prior to taking over the Kean program, Cocuzza had served as an assistant coach at Montclair State University for 27 years, most of which were as the Red Hawks' offensive coordinator.

Head coaching record

College

References

Living people
1940s births
American football quarterbacks
Kean Cougars football coaches
Montclair State Red Hawks football coaches
Upsala Vikings football players
High school football coaches in New Jersey
People from Monmouth County, New Jersey